The invisible hand is a metaphor used by the Scottish moral philosopher Adam Smith that describes the inducement a merchant has to keep his capital at home, thereby increasing the domestic capital stock and enhancing military power, both of which are in the public interest and neither of which he intended. Some later authors have broadened this to imply the unintended greater social impacts brought about by individuals acting in their own self-interests. Smith originally mentioned the term in his work Theory of Moral Sentiments in 1759, but it has actually become known from his main work The Wealth of Nations, where the phrase is mentioned only once, in connection with import restrictions. 

Similar ideas had already been presented before Smith by other Enlightenment thinkers, such as Anders Chydenius in his work The National Gain (1765) and Bernard Mandeville. Liberal thinkers wanted to show that society functions without collapsing even without the old hierarchical order of the feudal era. The concept was first introduced by Adam Smith in The Theory of Moral Sentiments, written in 1759. The exact phrase is used just three times in Smith's writings.

Smith may have come up with the two meanings of the phrase from Richard Cantillon who developed both economic applications in his model of the isolated estate.

The idea of trade and market exchange automatically channeling self-interest toward socially desirable ends is a central justification for the laissez-faire economic philosophy, which lies behind neoclassical economics. In this sense, the central disagreement between economic ideologies can be viewed as a disagreement about how powerful the "invisible hand" is. In alternative models, forces that were nascent during Smith's lifetime, such as large-scale industry, finance, and advertising, reduce its effectiveness.

There is some contention on whether Smith considered the Invisible Hand to be a positive feature of market economics, and his texts contained strong critique and colourful language about unchecked self-interest. 
Interpretations of the term have been generalized beyond the usage by Smith and some academic sources claim that the modern understanding of the concept was invented much more recently by Paul Samuelson to back up spontaneous order.

Pre-Adam Smith

Medieval Islamic World 
Some see an early reference to the concept of the invisible hand in 7th century Arabia where the Islamic prophet Muhammad, when asked by a merchant to fix prices of goods whose prices have shot up, Muhammad responds "It is but Allah [God] Who makes the prices low and high.", in other Hadith it is worded "Allah [God] is the one Who fixes prices". This has been interpreted and applied as the first application of a laissez faire free market where not even Muhammad can interfere in the free market.

Anders Chydenius 
The Swedish-Finnish scientist, philosopher and politician Anders Chydenius published his work The National Gain in 1765. In it he lays down the principles of liberalism and the free markets – for example, free trade and industry, and he also describes what Adam Smith later dubs the Invisible hand. For instance, Chydenius attacks the export subsidy as an example of the harmful effects of government intervention on the domestic economy.

Adam Smith

The Theory of Moral Sentiments 
The first appearance in the Western world of the invisible hand in Smith occurs in The Theory of Moral Sentiments (1759) in Part IV, Chapter 1, where he describes a selfish landlord as being led by an invisible hand to distribute his harvest to those who work for him:

Far from extolling the virtues of the "invisible hand" the overall tone of this passage is one that questions the distribution of wealth and laments the fact that the poor receive the "necessities of life" after the rich have gratified "their own vain and insatiable desires". Although elsewhere in The Theory of Moral Sentiments, Smith has described the desire of men to be respected by the members of the community in which they live, and the desire of men to feel that they are honorable beings.

The Wealth of Nations 
There is only one instance where the invisible hand is explicitly mentioned in The Wealth of Nations, that is in Book IV, Chapter II titled Of Restraints Upon the Importation from Foreign Countries of Such Goods as Can Be Produced at Home'.

Adam Smith starts by presenting the principle of self-interest and advances the conclusion he will reach near the end of the chapter, namely that self-interest results in public welfare:
He then explains that, assuming equal or similar profits, there is a preference for employing capital in home-trade over foreign trade and the latter over carrying trade:

This, he argues, is because the further the capital goes, the greater risk and transaction costs are. He does not exclude the possibility of special situations where capital is sent to "more distant employments".

So far Smith has argued that individuals act in their self-interest and that there is a preference for home-trade over foreign or carrying trade. Now, he adds that the capital employed in the home-trade necessarily boost the national industry, and increases employment and revenues for the inhabitants of the country to a larger degree than if it were employed outside; this also implies that there would be more resources for the provision of defense, which serves everyone and is, as Smith puts it, "the first duty of the sovereign". So not only is in the best interest of the individual to employ their capital in home-trade over the alternatives, but it is also the option most beneficial for society.''' It is in this way that the interest of the individual and his society align:

It is important to note that the preference for the domestic economy has nothing to do with nationalist ideas or biases, but rather just the home-trade preference presented previously.

Adam Smith goes on pointing out that the self-interest of individuals selects for those industries that create the greatest value. Thus, entrepreneurs will try to invest their capital in those industries where the production is expected to be of the greatest value, since they are also subject to self-interest (i.e. profit seeking):

Finally, in paragraph IX, Smith concludes the argumentation and directly uses the concept of "invisible hand"; since individuals look for the best use of their capital they will invest it in the domestic industry, which is the one that generates greatest societal benefits, and they will also direct the industries to those activities that provide the greatest value, thus every individual is employing his capital in the most optimal way as to increase society’s wealth, regardless of his particular care for the public good:

Essentially, the invisible hand refers to the unintended positive consecuences self-interest has on the promotion of public welfare.

It is also relevant to mention that, although the term “invisible hand” only appears explicitly here, this fundamental idea is present throughout The Wealth of Nations and the case treated in this chapter seems to be a particular example of this principle, rather than the principle itself, as noted by Smith ''is in this, as in many other cases, led by an invisible hand to promote an end which was no part of his intention" 

Adam Smith then goes on explaining how this "mechanism" cannot be replaced by bureucratic commands:

 Other uses of the phrase by Smith 
Only in The History of Astronomy (written before 1758) Smith speaks of the invisible hand, to which ignorants refer to explain natural phenomena otherwise unexplainable:

In The Theory of Moral Sentiments (1759) and in The Wealth of Nations (1776) Adam Smith speaks of an invisible hand, never of the invisible hand. In The Theory of Moral Sentiments Smith uses the concept to sustain a "trickling down" theory, a concept also used in neoclassical development theory: The gluttony of the rich serves to feed the poor.

Smith's visit to France and his acquaintance to the French Économistes (known as Physiocrats) changed his views from micro-economic optimisation to macro-economic growth as the end of Political Economy. So the landlord's gluttony in The Theory of Moral Sentiments is denounced in the Wealth of Nations as unproductive labour. Walker, the first president (1885 to 92) of the American Economic Association, concurred:

Smith's theoretical U-turn from a micro-economical to a macro-economical view is not reflected in The Wealth of Nations. Large parts of this book are retaken from Smith's lectures before his visit to France. So one must distinguish in The Wealth of Nations a micro-economical and a macro-economical Adam Smith. Whether Smith's quotation of an invisible hand in the middle of his work is a micro-economical statement or a macro-economical statement condemning monopolies and government interferences as in the case of tariffs and patents is debatable.

 Economists' interpretation 
The concept of the "invisible hand" is nearly always generalized beyond Smith's original uses. The phrase was not popular among economists before the twentieth century; Alfred Marshall never used it in his Principles of Economics textbook and neither does William Stanley Jevons in his Theory of Political Economy. Paul Samuelson cites it in his Economics textbook in 1948:

In this interpretation, the theory is that the Invisible Hand states that if each consumer is allowed to choose freely what to buy and each producer is allowed to choose freely what to sell and how to produce it, the market will settle on a product distribution and prices that are beneficial to all the individual members of a community, and hence to the community as a whole. The reason for this is that self-interest drives actors to beneficial behavior in a case of serendipity. Efficient methods of production are adopted to maximize profits. Low prices are charged to maximize revenue through gain in market share by undercutting competitors. Investors invest in those industries most urgently needed to maximize returns, and withdraw capital from those less efficient in creating value. All these effects take place dynamically and automatically.

Since Smith's time, this concept has been further incorporated into economic theory. Léon Walras developed a four-equation general equilibrium model that concludes that individual self-interest operating in a competitive market place produces the unique conditions under which a society's total utility is maximized. Vilfredo Pareto used an Edgeworth box contact line to illustrate a similar social optimality. Ludwig von Mises, in Human Action uses the expression "the invisible hand of Providence", referring to Marx's period, to mean evolutionary meliorism. He did not mean this as a criticism, since he held that secular reasoning leads to similar conclusions. Milton Friedman, a Nobel Memorial Prize winner in economics, called Smith's Invisible Hand "the possibility of cooperation without coercion." Kaushik Basu has called the First Welfare Theorem the Invisible Hand Theorem.

Some economists question the integrity of how the term "invisible hand" is currently used.  Gavin Kennedy, Professor Emeritus at Heriot-Watt University in Edinburgh, Scotland, argues that its current use in modern economic thinking as a symbol of free market capitalism is not reconcilable with the rather modest and indeterminate manner in which it was employed by Smith. In response to Kennedy, Daniel Klein argues that reconciliation is legitimate.  Moreover, even if Smith did not intend the term "invisible hand" to be used in the current manner, its serviceability as such should not be rendered ineffective. In conclusion of their exchange, Kennedy insists that Smith's intentions are of utmost importance to the current debate, which is one of Smith's association with the term "invisible hand".  If the term is to be used as a symbol of liberty and economic coordination as it has been in the modern era, Kennedy argues that it should exist as a construct completely separate from Adam Smith since there is little evidence that Smith imputed any significance onto the term, much less the meanings given it at present.

The former Drummond Professor of Political Economy at Oxford, D. H. MacGregor, argued that:

Harvard economist Stephen Marglin argues that while the "invisible hand" is the "most enduring phrase in Smith's entire work", it is "also the most misunderstood."

According to Emma Rothschild, Smith was actually being ironic in his use of the term. Warren Samuels described it as "a means of relating modern high theory to Adam Smith and, as such, an interesting example in the development of language."

 Understood as a metaphor 
Smith uses the metaphor in the context of an argument against protectionism and government regulation of markets, but it is based on very broad principles developed by Bernard Mandeville, Bishop Butler, Lord Shaftesbury, and Francis Hutcheson. In general, the term "invisible hand" can apply to any individual action that has unplanned, unintended consequences, particularly those that arise from actions not orchestrated by a central command, and that have an observable, patterned effect on the community.

Bernard Mandeville argued that private vices are actually public benefits. In The Fable of the Bees (1714), he laments that the "bees of social virtue are buzzing in Man's bonnet": that civilized man has stigmatized his private appetites and the result is the retardation of the common good.

Bishop Butler argued that pursuing the public good was the best way of advancing one's own good since the two were necessarily identical.

Lord Shaftesbury turned the convergence of public and private good around, claiming that acting in accordance with one's self-interest produces socially beneficial results. An underlying unifying force that Shaftesbury called the "Will of Nature"  maintains equilibrium, congruency, and harmony. This force, to operate freely, requires the individual pursuit of rational self-interest, and the preservation and advancement of the self.

Francis Hutcheson also accepted this convergence between public and private interest, but he attributed the mechanism, not to rational self-interest, but to personal intuition, which he called a "moral sense". Smith developed his own version of this general principle in which six psychological motives combine in each individual to produce the common good. In The Theory of Moral Sentiments, vol. II, page 316, he says, "By acting according to the dictates of our moral faculties, we necessarily pursue the most effective means for promoting the happiness of mankind."Contrary to common misconceptions, Smith did not assert that all self-interested labour necessarily benefits society, or that all public goods are produced through self-interested labour. His proposal is merely that in a free market, people usually tend to produce goods desired by their neighbours. The tragedy of the commons is an example where self-interest tends to bring an unwanted result.

The invisible hand is traditionally understood as a concept in economics, but Robert Nozick argues in Anarchy, State and Utopia that substantively the same concept exists in a number of other areas of academic discourse under different names, notably Darwinian natural selection. In turn, Daniel Dennett argues in Darwin's Dangerous Idea that this represents a "universal acid" that may be applied to a number of seemingly disparate areas of philosophical inquiry (consciousness and free will in particular), a hypothesis known as Universal Darwinism. Positing an economy guided by this principle as ideal may amount to Social Darwinism, which is also associated with champions of laissez-faire capitalism.

 Tawney's interpretation 
Christian socialist R. H. Tawney saw Smith as putting a name on an older idea:

 Criticisms 

Joseph E. Stiglitz
The Nobel Prize-winning economist Joseph E. Stiglitz, says: "the reason that the invisible hand often seems invisible is that it is often not there."<ref>The Roaring Nineties, 2006</ref> Stiglitz explains his position:

The preceding claim is based on Stiglitz's 1986 paper, "Externalities in Economies with Imperfect Information and Incomplete Markets", which describes a general methodology to deal with externalities and for calculating optimal corrective taxes in a general equilibrium context. In it he considers a model with households, firms and a government.

The government receives a net income , where  is a tax on the goods sold to households.

It can be shown that in general the resulting equilibrium is not efficient.

{| class="toccolours collapsible collapsed" width="90%" style="text-align:left"
!Proof
|-
|It is worth keeping in mind that an equilibrium for the model may not necessarily exist. If it exists and there are no taxes (Ih=0, ∀h), then demand equals supply, and the equilibrium is found by:

Let's use  as a simplifying notation, where  is the expenditure function that allows the minimization of household expenditure for a certain level of utility. If there is a set of taxes, subsidies, and lump sum transfers that leaves household utilities unchanged and increase government revenues, then the above equilibrium is not Pareto optimal. On the other hand, if the above non taxed equilibrium is Pareto optimal, then the following maximization problem has a solution for t=0:

 

This is a necessary condition for Pareto optimality. Taking the derivative of the constraint with respect to t yields:

But since q=t+p, we have that dq/dt=IN-1+dp/dt. Therefore, substituting dq/dt in the equation above and rearranging terms gives:

Summing over all households and keeping in mind that  yields:

By the envelope theorem we have:

;∀k

This allows the constraint to be rewritten as:

Since :

Differentiating the objective function of the maximization problem gives:

Substituting  from the former equation in to latter equation results in:

Recall that for the maximization problem to have a solution a t=0:

In conclusion, for the equilibrium to be Pareto optimal dR/dt must be zero. Except for the special case where Π and B are equal, in general the equilibrium will not be Pareto optimal, therefore inefficient.
|}

Noam Chomsky

Noam Chomsky suggests that Smith (and more specifically David Ricardo) sometimes used the phrase to refer to a "home bias" for investing domestically in opposition to offshore outsourcing production and neoliberalism.

Stephen LeRoy
Stephen LeRoy, professor emeritus at the University of California, Santa Barbara, and a visiting scholar at the Federal Reserve Bank of San Francisco, offered a critique of the Invisible Hand, writing that "The single most important proposition in economic theory, first stated by Adam Smith, is that competitive markets do a good job allocating resources. (...) The financial crisis has spurred a debate about the proper balance between markets and government and prompted some scholars to question whether the conditions assumed by Smith...are accurate for modern economies.

John D. Bishop
John D. Bishop, a professor who worked at Trent University, Peterborough, indicates that the invisible hand might be applied differently to merchants and manufacturers from how it is applied with society. He wrote an article in 1995 titled "Adam Smith's Invisible Hand Argument", in which he suggests that Smith might be contradicting himself with the "Invisible Hand". He offers various critiques of the "Invisible Hand", and he writes that "the interest of business people are in fundamental conflict with the interest of society as a whole, and that business people pursue their personal goal at the expense of the public good". Thus, Bishop indicates that the "business people" are in conflict with society over the same interests and that Adam Smith might be contradicting himself. According to Bishop, he also gives the impression that in Smith's book 'The Wealth of Nations,' there's a close saying that "the interest of merchants and manufacturers were fundamentally opposed of society in general, and they had an inherent tendency to deceive and oppress society while pursuing their own interests." Bishop also states that the "invisible hand argument applies only to investing capital in one's own country for a maximum profit." In other words, he suggests that the invisible hand applies to only the merchants and manufacturers and that they're not the invisible force that moves the economy. He contends the argument "does not apply to the pursuit of self-interest (...) in any area outside of economic activities".

See also 
Books

 Essays on Philosophical Subjects by Adam Smith
 I, Pencil by Leonard Read
 The National Gain by Anders Chydenius
 The Theory of Moral Sentiments by Adam Smith
 The Visible Hand by Alfred Chandler
 The Wealth of Nations by Adam Smith

Articles

 Corporation
 Emergence
 Enlightened self-interest
 Free price system
 Laissez-faire
 Market fundamentalism
 Objectivism
 Opportunity cost
 Philosophy of social science
 Rational egoism
 Spontaneous order
 Trickle-down economics
 "The Use of Knowledge in Society"
 The Visible Hand: The Managerial Revolution in American Business
 Vanishing Hand

References

Bibliography

Further reading

 The Theory of Moral Sentiments (full text) 
 The Wealth of Nations (full text)

External links 
 Oslington, Paul (2012). God and the Market: Adam Smith's Invisible Hand // JSTOR

Adam Smith
Classical liberalism
Free market